Nelson R. Starkey Jr. (June 24, 1929 – December 15, 2005) was an American politician who served in the Alabama House of Representatives from November 1978 until his death in December 2005.

Politics
He served his first term in the Alabama House of Representatives in 1978.

He represented District 2 from 1978 until 1984, where he was redistricted to District 1. He served in that district from 1984 until his death in 2005.

References

1929 births
2005 deaths
Members of the Alabama House of Representatives
People from Tuscaloosa, Alabama
20th-century American politicians